The 2022 Korn Ferry Tour was the 32nd season of the top developmental tour for the PGA Tour in men's golf, and the third under the sponsored name of Korn Ferry Tour.

Schedule
The following table lists official events during the 2022 season.

Points leaders
For full rankings, see 2022 Korn Ferry Tour Finals graduates.

Regular season points leaders
The regular season points list was based on prize money won during the season, calculated using a points-based system. The top 25 players on the tour earned status to play on the 2022–23 PGA Tour.

Finals points leaders
A further 25 players earned status to play on the 2022–23 PGA Tour, via the Korn Ferry Tour Finals.

Awards

Notes

References

External links
Official schedule

Korn Ferry Tour seasons
Korn Ferry Tour